Daniel Acosta (born June 10, 1991, in Mexico City) is a Mexican professional footballer who plays for Atlante of Ascenso MX on loan from América.

References

Liga MX players
Living people
Atlante F.C. footballers
Club América footballers
1991 births
Footballers from Mexico City
Association football defenders
Mexican footballers